CIMS-FM (Radio Restigouche) is a Canadian French-language community radio station operating at 103.9 MHz/FM, located in Balmoral, New Brunswick. According to the Canadian Radio-television and Telecommunications Commission (CRTC), the station's city of licence is Balmoral, but the Industry Canada database lists the station as being based in Campbellton.

History
CIMS-FM goes back to 1991 when Coopérative Radio Restigouche Ltée received CRTC approval to operate a special FM licence undertaking Dalhousie at 99.9 MHz from June 27–30, 1991.

On August 12, 1993, Coopérative Radio Restigouche Ltée received CRTC approval to operate a new French-language FM radio station at 103.9 MHz in Balmoral. CIMS-FM began broadcasting on September 19, 1994. In 1997, CIMS-FM received approval from the CRTC to operate a new low-power FM transmitter at 96.7 MHz in Dalhousie.

The station operates under a community radio licence and is owned by a non-profit group known as "La Coopérative Radio Restigouche".  It broadcasts on 103.9 MHz using a directional antenna with an average effective radiated power of 7,295 watts and a peak effective radiated power of 15,000 watts (class B).

CIMS-FM also operates a rebroadcaster in Dalhousie, namely CIMS-FM-1, which broadcasts on 96.7 MHz with an effective radiated power of 8 watts (class LP) using an omnidirectional antenna.

The station is a member of the Alliance des radios communautaires du Canada.

References

External links
Radio Restigouche
 
 

Ims
Ims
Ims
Radio stations established in 1991
1991 establishments in New Brunswick